Launched in early 1970 and based largely on the Arab policy of France, the idea of a Euro-Arab dialogue took shape in 1973 following the Yom Kippur War and the first oil shock, thanks to French President Georges Pompidou and his Foreign Minister, Michel Jobert. The parties were the European Economic Community and the Arab League.

The aim was to thoroughly review the very nature of Euro-Arab relations and to achieve an overhaul of relations between the partners, on the basis of equality and respect for the interests of each. At the same time, the Euro-Arab dialogue had a strong political content, which aimed to create Euro-Arab cooperation against the United States and to put pressure on Israel.

The Euro-Arab dialogue is a central part of the Eurabia thesis of Bat Ye'or.

See also
 Euromediterranean Partnership
 Union for the Mediterranean

References

Literature
 
 
 Dajani, Ahmed. Dialogue euro-arabe, point de vue arabe, (in Arab). Le Caire : Maktaba Anglo-égyptienne, 1976.
 Khader, Bichara. L'Europe et le monde arabe: Cousins, voisins. Paris : Publisud, 1992.
 Saint-Prot, Charles (dir.). Le dialogue euro-arabe. Paris : Revue d’études des relations internationales, n°34, été 1981.
 Saint-Prot Charles et El TIBI Zeina (dir.). Quelle union pour quelle Méditerranée ? Contributions de Mustapha Cherif, Emmanuel Dupuy, Henri Guaino, Bichara Khader, Jawad Kerdoudi, Alain Leroy, Antoine-Tristan Mocilnikar, Hatem M’rad, Pierre Pascallon, Gilles Pennequin, Salah Stétié. Paris : Observatoire d'études géopolitiques, Études géopolitiques 9- Karthala, 2008.

External links 
 https://web.archive.org/web/20150709040540/http://www.medea.be/?doc=55&lang=en

Foreign relations of the European Union
Eurabia